Anxcity is the second solo EP by jazz pianist Mike Garson. It was released in 2007 on MG&A Records.

Track listing
Radio Static Lies
Anxcity
Collapsing Cities
The Quandry

References

External links
  Anxcity - Myspace site-  EP download
 Regenmag Review-  EP track listing and review
 

2007 EPs
Mike Garson albums